The Temeke Regional Referral Hospital is a 304  bed hospital in Dar es Salaam, Tanzania servicing the Temeke District.

References

Hospitals in Tanzania